Anna Berit Salomonsson (married name Wahlberg, born 2 August 1951) is a retired Swedish luger. She placed 13th in the singles event at the 1968 Winter Olympics.

References

External links
 

1951 births
Living people
Swedish female lugers
Olympic lugers of Sweden
Lugers at the 1968 Winter Olympics
People from Ragunda Municipality
Sportspeople from Jämtland County